Rolando Delgado (born November 22, 1981) is an American mixed martial arts trainer and a former mixed martial artist. He has fought for the Ultimate Fighting Championship, and Bellator Fighting Championships. He was a cast member on The Ultimate Fighter 8.

Early life
Delgado was born on November 22, 1981, in San Diego, California. He moved to Little Rock, Arkansas when he was 15 years old and began training in mixed martial arts (MMA).

MMA career

Early career
Delgado began his career as a cast member UFC's, TUF 8. Although he did not win the show, Delgado submitted castmate John Polakowski via guillotine choke at TUF 8 Finale. He won his debut fight in December 2008. He has competed at Extreme Brawl, Modern Ringsport and Absolute Fighting Championships.  He was a cast member of SpikeTV's reality show, The Ultimate Fighter and is a co-owner of Westside MMA in Little Rock.

Delgado was released from his UFC contract following back to back losses to Paul Kelly at UFC 99 and to Andre Winner at UFC 105.

After departing from the UFC, Delgado dropped back down to his original weight class and won twice in Arkansas MMA promotions and later at an undercard fight by unanimous decision.

Personal life
Delgado has a son who was born in 2008.

Mixed martial arts record

|-
|Loss
|align=center|11–6–1
|Chris Gruetzemacher
|TKO (elbows)
|ShoFight MMA 20
|
|align=center|3
|align=center|3:24
|Springfield, Missouri, United States
|
|-
|Win
|align=center|11–5–1
|Jameel Massouh
|Decision (unanimous)
|Bellator 37
|
|align=center|3
|align=center|5:00
|Concho, Oklahoma, United States
|
|-
|Win
|align=center|10–5–1
|Anthony Jones
|Decision (unanimous)
|Subzero 8: The Ultimate Performing Art
|
|align=center|3
|align=center|5:00
|Little Rock, Arkansas, United States
|
|-
|Win
|align=center|9–5–1
|Brandon Shelton
|Submission (triangle choke)
|C3 Fights: Knockout-Rockout Weekend 3
|
|align=center|1
|align=center|1:44
|Concho, Oklahoma, United States
|
|-
|Loss
|align=center|8–5–1
|Andre Winner
|KO (punch)
|UFC 105
|
|align=center|1
|align=center|3:22
|Manchester, England
|
|-
|Loss
|align=center|8–4–1
|Paul Kelly
|Decision (unanimous)
|UFC 99
|
|align=center| 3
|align=center| 5:00
|Cologne, Germany
|
|-
| Win
|align=center|8–3–1
|John Polakowski
| Submission (guillotine choke)
|The Ultimate Fighter 8 Finale
|
|align=center| 2
|align=center| 2:18
|Las Vegas, Nevada, United States
|
|-
|Win
|align=center|7–3–1
|Brandon Jinnies
|Submission (armbar)
|NLE: Last Man Standing 2
|
|align=center|1
|align=center|2:38
|Louisiana, United States
|
|-
|Win
|align=center|6–3–1
|Josh Pearson
|Submission (armbar)
|NLE: Last Man Standing 2
|
|align=center|2
|align=center|0:46
|Louisiana, United States
|
|-
| Draw
|align=center|5–3–1
|David Love
|Draw
|Absolute Fighting Championships 18
|
|align=center|2
|align=center|5:00
|Boca Raton, Florida, United States
|
|-
|Win
|align=center|5–3
|Jarrett Becks
|TKO (retirement)
|Modern Ringsport II
|
|align=center|1
|align=center|5:00
|Little Rock, Arkansas, United States
|
|-
|Win
|align=center|4–3
|Aaron Williams
|Decision (split)
|Modern Ringsport I
|
|align=center|3
|align=center|5:00
|Little Rock, Arkansas, United States
|
|-
|Loss
|align=center|3–3
|Jorge Masvidal
|TKO (punches)
|Absolute Fighting Championships 5
|
|align=center|2
|align=center|2:14
|Fort Lauderdale, Florida, United States
|
|-
|Loss
|align=center|3–2
|Jason Ireland
|Decision (unanimous)
|Dangerzone: Dakota Destruction
|
|align=center|3
|align=center|5:00
|New Town, North Dakota, United States
|
|-
|Loss
|align=center|3–1
|Joe Jordan
|Decision (unanimous)
|Shooto Americas: Tennessee Shoot-Conquest
|
|align=center|2
|align=center|5:00
|Clarksville, Tennessee, United States
|
|-
|Win
|align=center|3–0
|Neil McLeod
|Submission (triangle choke)
|Extreme Brawl 1
|
|align=center|1
|align=center|N/A
|Bracknell, England
|
|-
|Win
|align=center|2–0
|Nick Roscorla
|Submission (triangle choke)
|Ultimate Reality Combat 1
|
|align=center|1
|align=center|3:55
|United States
|
|-
|Win
|align=center|1–0
|Cleve Tuttle
|KO (flying knee)
|Ultimate Reality Combat 1
|
|align=center|1
|align=center|0:12
|United States
|

References

External links
 
 

1981 births
Living people
American male mixed martial artists
Mixed martial artists from California
Featherweight mixed martial artists
Lightweight mixed martial artists
Mixed martial artists utilizing Brazilian jiu-jitsu
American mixed martial artists of Cuban descent
American practitioners of Brazilian jiu-jitsu
People awarded a black belt in Brazilian jiu-jitsu
Ultimate Fighting Championship male fighters